The single-particle spectrum is a distribution of a physical quantity such as energy or momentum. The study of particle spectra allows us to see the global picture of particle production.
The spectrum are particles that are in space. This belongs to Raman spectroscopy by Chandrasekhar Venkata Raman. Spectrum particles are nothing but the VIBGYOR rays which are separated by prism or water. For example, a rainbow.

Physical quantities